Miss Dolly Dollars is a musical comedy written in two acts with the book and lyrics by Harry B. Smith and music by Victor Herbert.  The musical concerns a wealthy American girl in Europe, who is sought after by bankrupt aristocrats.  Its score includes a few famous songs such as "A Woman is Only a Woman (But a Good Cigar is a Smoke)".

After a tryout in Rochester, New York, the musical opened at the Knickerbocker Theatre in New York City, on September 4, 1905.  It was produced by Charles B. Dillingham and directed by Al Holbrook, with music direction by Antonio DeNovellis. The scenic design was by Homer Emens and Edward G. Unitt, and costumes were by Caroline Seidle.  The show soon transferred to the New Amsterdam Theatre on October 16, 1905. It ran for a total of 56 performances.

Synopsis
Wealthy Dorothy Gay, an American girl, is pursued while in Europe, by a number of penniless aristocrats, but she does not wish to marry simply for a title.  A secretary, Finney Doolittle, is mistaken for his wealthy English Lord.  Dorothy's father, Samuel, urges her to marry the phony Lord Burlingham, but she prefers a man whom she takes to be poor, but who is actually the English nobleman, and all ends happily.

Cast
The opening night cast was as follows:

Beatrice Anderson - Matilda
John Ardizone -	Duke de Bolero
Leila Benton -	Vena Rodriguez
Charles Bradshaw - Samuel Gay
Mildred Cecil -	Hon. Reggy Chumpley
Marion Chase - Vera Vane
Carter DeHaven - Guy Gay
Elizabeth Doddridge - Hon. Algy Sydney
Elsie Ferguson - Celeste
Joseph Frohoff - First Bailiff
Lulu Glaser - Dorothy Gay
Minerva Hall - Jane
Sidney A. Harris - H'Alfred/ Prince Umskyvitch
Carl Hartberg - Baron von Rheinheister
Ralph C. Herz -	Finney Doolittle
Queenie Hewlitt - Millicent
Bessie Holbrook - Hon. Montague Bank
Edward Leahy - Captain Sheridan Barry
James Leahy - The Marquis de Baccarat
Helen Marlborough - Ruth Delamere
Olive Murray - Bertha Billings
William Naughton - The Hon. Percy Fitzboodle
Byron Ongley - Miggs
Enrico Oremonte - Count Chianti/ Bobby
Susanne Parker - Miriam Odell
Carrie Perkins - Mrs. Gay
Sadie Probst - Hon. Mayland Bank
James Reany - Count Runoffsky
Aline Redmond - Greta Giltedge
Elsa Reinhardt - Freda Dressler
L. F. Sampson - Second Bailiff
Lillian Spencer - Margery
Melville Stuart - Lord Burlingham
Lillie Van Arsdale - 'Arriet
Henry Vogel - Lieutenant von Richter
Vida Whitmore - Estelle DeLange
Gladys Zell - Vashti

Musical numbers
Act I
The Self-Made Family (She's a Lady with Money) – Mrs. Gay, Samuel Gay and Guy Gay
An Educated Fool (It Keeps Me Guessing All the Time) – Finney Doolittle
Just Get Out and Walk – Dorothy Gay and Chorus
An American Heiress – Dorothy and Noblemen
Dolly Dollars – Guy 
My Fair Unknown – Lord Burlingham

Act II
It's All in the Book You Know – Dorothy and Lieutenant von Richter
Life's a Masquerade – Mrs. Gay, Samuel, Celeste and Guy 
The Moth and the Moon – Dorothy and Chorus
Walks – Guy and Girls
A Woman Is Only a Woman, But a Good Cigar is a Smoke (Puff, Puff, Puff) – Lord Burlingham
(American Music) 'Tis Better Than Old Parsifal to Me – Principals and Chorus
Queen of the Ring – Dorothy and Chorus

References

External links
 Miss Dolly Dollars at the Internet Broadway Database
 Links to MIDI files and other information about Miss Dolly Dollars
NY Tribune review

1905 operas
1905 musicals
Broadway musicals
Compositions by Victor Herbert